Universal solvent may refer to:

Water, described as the "universal solvent" for its ability to dissolve many substances
Alkahest, a hypothetical solvent able to dissolve every other substance
The Universal Solvent, a comic by Don Rosa